Anja Chong (born March 10, 1994) is a Singaporean-born Malaysian short track speed skater.

Personal life
Chong was born and raised in Singapore, holding permanent residency (PR) in the country. She was educated at the United World College of South East Asia in Dover. Her mother, Sonja Chong, was the president of the Singapore Ice Skating Association (SISA).

Chong and her mother are both Malaysian citizens. In 2011, when Chong was 17, they attempted to apply for Singaporean citizenship after being offered a ticket by the Olympic Council of Asia to compete at the 2011 Asian Winter Games in Kazakhstan, but their applications were rejected.

She noted her disappointment, stating that "I would've stayed in Singapore because I started out here, but I had no choice. In order to compete at the Olympics, I needed citizenship." At the same time, she was also offered the spot by Malaysia, but had turned it down in the hopes of competing for Singapore. Eventually, she relented in having to represent Malaysia instead for future competitions to continue her career.

Career

Singapore

Asian Junior Challenge
Prior to 2012, Chong represented the country of her birth, including the Asian Junior Challenge in 2008 that was held in Hong Kong, where she earned a bronze medal.

World Junior Figure Skating Championships
In 2009, she represented Singapore at the 2009 World Junior Figure Skating Championships.

Malaysia

2017 Southeast Asian Games
Chong began representing Malaysia at her first SEA Games in 2017 which was held in Kuala Lumpur, where she won 3 gold medals in the 500m, 1000m and 3000m ladies relay. The sport was specifically created for that SEA Games, being the first time a winter sport was contested in SEA Games history, having only been competed by tropical countries.

One month before the SEA Games, she became the Malaysian Short Track Speed Skating National Champion, sweeping all the ladies events – the 500m and the 1000m.

Asian Winter Games
In February 2017, Anja took part in the 2017 Asian Winter Games in Sapporo. Competing in the 500m and the 1000m, she did not reach the finals, falling short in the heats.

2019 Southeast Asian Games
In 2019, Chong competed at her second SEA Games, which was held in the Philippines. She competed in the 500m, 1000m, and the 3000m relay. Although not winning any medals for the 1000m, she did won a bronze at the 500m, with the gold going to Singapore's Cheyenne Goh, and managed to get a single gold for the 3000m relay.

References

External links 
 

1994 births
Living people
Singaporean female short track speed skaters
Short track speed skaters at the 2017 Asian Winter Games
Southeast Asian Games gold medalists for Malaysia
Southeast Asian Games medalists in short track speed skating
Competitors at the 2017 Southeast Asian Games
Competitors at the 2019 Southeast Asian Games
Southeast Asian Games bronze medalists for Malaysia
People educated at a United World College